Gray Rothwell "Mick" Sibun (12 April 1929 – 1 May 2011) was an Australian rules footballer who played for South Melbourne Football Club in the Victorian Football League (VFL) between 1950 and 1956, mainly as a rover and half-forward flanker. He also played interstate football for Victoria. Sibun grew up in Albert Park, Victoria, which at the time fell into South Melbourne's recruitment zone. Along with Bob Giles, Sibun played for South Melbourne Under-19s. He made his debut for South Melbourne in Round 1 of the 1950 season, kicking two goals on debut in a match the Swans won by 20 points. Sibun played mainly as a half-forward flanker, kicking 88 goals in his 111-game VFL career, with a best of four goals, which he recorded twice - once in 1953 against , and once in 1954, against  After the 1956 season, Sibun left the VFL to become playing-coach at Rupanyup in the Wimmera Football League (WFL). He captained-coached the club to its first premiership in 1961, and to another in 1963. In total he played 133 games for Rupanyup. He is considered by some to be the best footballer to ever play in the WFL.

See also 
 List of South Melbourne Football Club players

References

External links

1929 births
2011 deaths
Australian rules footballers from Melbourne
Sydney Swans players
Rupanyup Football Club players
People from Albert Park, Victoria
Australian rules football coaches